CLP may stand for:

Biology
 CLP protease family, a family of proteolytic enzymes
 Endopeptidase Clp, an enzyme complex
 ATP-dependent Clp protease proteolytic subunit, a catalytic subunit of the Clp complex (encoded by the CLPP gene in humans)

Businesses 
 CLP Group, formerly China Light and Power
 Connecticut Light and Power Company

Computing, mathematics, and technology 
 Cell Loss Priority
 COIN-OR Linear Program Solver
 Communication Linking Protocol
 Congruence lattice problem
 Constraint Logic Programming
 Constraint logic programming (Real)
 Control Language Programming, an IBM programming language used on the System/38, AS/400, and successors
 Convergent Linux Platform

Political parties 
 Canadian Labour Party, former
 Communist Labor Party of America, predecessors of the Communist Party USA
 Constituency Labour Party, a sub-division of the British Labour Party representing a single UK constituency
 Country Liberal Party, Northern Territory, Australia

Certifications 
 Certificate in Legal Practice (Malaysia)
 Certified Landscape Professional

Transport
 Clapham High Street railway station, London, National Rail station code CLP
 Clarks Point Airport, Alaska, IATA airport code CLP

Other uses 
 AOL Community Leader Program
 CLP Regulation on classification, labelling and packaging of chemicals, EU
 Cleaner, Lubricant, Preservative, US weapons fluid code
 Chilean peso, the currency of Chile by ISO 4217 code
 Cleft lip and palate
 Cloppenburg (district), Germany
 Copa de la Liga Profesional, an Argentine football competition